Batch Monitor is a computer program created by Apple Computer for viewing and monitoring encoding tasks on a single or multiple computers. It comes with Compressor.